"Dance (Ass)", often stylized "Dance (A$$)", is a song by American rapper Big Sean, released as the third single from his debut studio album, Finally Famous (2011). It was added to urban radio formats on September 20, 2011 as the album's third official single. The official remix of the song features Nicki Minaj. It samples MC Hammer's "U Can't Touch This", which in turn samples Rick James's single "Super Freak".

Critical reception
The Boston Globe commented on the track by saying it is a "stale stripper anthem out of synch with what surrounds it. The production is heavy on vocal hooks, synths, and chattering beats, but the focus is Sean’s wit and insistent flow."<ref>{{cite news|url=http://articles.boston.com/2011-06-28/ae/29713375_1_big-sean-wiz-khalifa-lupe-fiasco |title=Big Sean "Finally Famous |newspaper=The Boston Globe |access-date=September 16, 2011 |url-status=dead |archive-url=https://web.archive.org/web/20110811051013/http://articles.boston.com/2011-06-28/ae/29713375_1_big-sean-wiz-khalifa-lupe-fiasco |archive-date=August 11, 2011 }}</ref> The New York Times complimented the song's use of MC Hammer's "U Can't Touch This" and further went on to say that the song "basically cribs its chorus (uncredited) from the oeuvre of DJ Assault, the Detroit ghettotech innovator. Nowhere does Big Sean sound more confident or hilarious." The A.V. Club gave a positive review of the track and called it freewheeling, fast-footed, and full of swagger. The Village Voice complimented Sean's performance on the track and said "he took his microphone and turned it into an extension of his phallus, waving it down there like a gleeful toddler as the track imbued new meaning to MC Hammer's signature phrase 'Hammer Time', released in 1990 to the artist Hammer Time."

Ology commented on the song by calling it a positive minority in the album and complimented the "flow-flip" and "low bass tones" in the song. HipHopDX commented on the song and said that it "narrowly escapes formulaic territory by injecting enough personality, comedy and verbal gymnastics to ably complement Da Internz' pounding, dance-ready bassline." Complex'' did not favor the track and called it repetitive and minimalist compared to most of the other tracks on the album.

Music video
The music video of the song's remix version premiered on Vevo on November 1, 2011.

Charts

Weekly charts

Year-end charts

Certifications 

|+Certifications and sales for "Dance (Ass)"

Radio and release history

References

2011 singles
Big Sean songs
Nicki Minaj songs
GOOD Music singles
Def Jam Recordings singles
Songs written by Nicki Minaj
Songs about dancing
Song recordings produced by Da Internz
2011 songs
Songs written by Big Sean
Songs written by Rick James